Christie Front Drive is the debut EP released by the American indie rock/emo band, Christie Front Drive through Freewill Records in 1994. All the tracks were reissued on their next release, Anthology. The remastered edition was released on Magic Bullet Records on May 21, 2013.

Track listing
"Turn" – 4:03
"Dyed on 8" – 5:20
"Long Out" – 4:13
"Lot" – 5:31
"Pipe" – 5:28
"Dirt" – 3:53

Personnel
Eric Richter – vocals, guitar
Jason Begin – guitar
Kerry McDonald – bass
Ron Marschall – drums

References

Christie Front Drive albums
1994 EPs